Spring Garden Township may refer to the following townships in the United States:

 Spring Garden Township, Jefferson County, Illinois
 Spring Garden Township, York County, Pennsylvania